Independence from Europe was a minor political party in Great Britain.

2014 European Parliament election
With 1.5% of the national vote, An Independence from Europe finished in seventh place. It was the highest placed party to not win a seat.

2015 general election
All candidates lost their deposits.

References

Election results by party in the United Kingdom
Eurosceptic parties in the United Kingdom
Political parties established in 2013